Àmàlà is a staple swallow food native to the Yoruba ethnic group of Southwestern Nigeria. It is made of yam, cassava flour, or unripe plantain flour. Tubers of yams are peeled, sliced, cleaned, dried and then ground into flour. It is also called èlùbọ́. Yams are white in colour but turn brown when dried which gives àmàlà its colour. It is a popular side dish served with ewédú and gbẹ̀gìrì (black-eyed beans soup), but is also served with a variety of other ọbè(soups), such as ẹ̀fọ́, ilá, and ogbono.

Types
There are three types of àmàlà: àmàlà isu, àmàlà láfún, and amala ògèdè.

Yam flour (àmàlà isu)
Àmàlà isu, the most common type of àmàlà, is yam-based. The particular yam species best for preparing àmàlà is Dioscorea cayenensis (Ikoro) because of its high starch content. Because of its perishability, yam is often dried and made into flour. The flour can then be reconstituted with hot water to form a paste or gel called kokonte in Ghana and Togo, and àmàlà in Nigeria. Àmàlà isu is made of dried yam. This gives it a black/brownish colour when added to boiling water. Amala is rich in carbohydrates and is an important source of carbohydrate, especially in the yam zone of West Africa.

Cassava flour (àmàlà láfún)
Àmàlà láfún is made from cassava flour. Dried cassava flour is known as lafun in Nigeria and konkonte in Ghana.

Plantain flour (Amala ogede)
Another type of Amala is elubo ogede, which is usually lighter in color. The low carbohydrate level in plantain flour makes it suitable for diabetics. Unripe plantain is peeled, dried, and grated into boiling water, creating a light brown paste when cooked.

Soups
Àmàlà can be eaten with various soups:
 Egusi: soup made of thickened melon seeds and leaf vegetables.
 Ewedu soup: made from cooked and grated Corchorus leaves with or without a small quantity of egusi and/or locust beans.
 Okro soup: made from okra.
 Efo riro: made from vegetables and a mixture of meat, fish, cow skin (ponmo) etc.
 Ogbono soup: made from ground ogbono seeds and a mixture of palm oil, stock fish and locust beans (irú) added as garnish.
 Gbegiri soup: made from dried beans.

See also
 Eba
 Fufu
 List of African dishes
 Nigerian cuisine

References

External links
habeeb olonje
Amala Food recipe

Nigerian cuisine
Staple foods
Yoruba cuisine
Swallows (food)